Pityohyphantes subarcticus is a species of sheetweb spider in the family Linyphiidae. It is found in Canada and USA (Alaska).

References

Linyphiidae
Articles created by Qbugbot
Spiders described in 1943